Naomi Osaka is an American documentary television miniseries directed by Garrett Bradley. It follows the life of professional tennis player Naomi Osaka over the course of two years. It consists of three episodes, and premiered on July 16, 2021, on Netflix.

Plot
The series follows Naomi Osaka over the course of two years.

Episodes

Production
Netflix approached Garrett Bradley about making a docuseries revolving around Naomi Osaka. Bradley wanted the series to feel as if the viewer was journeying alongside Osaka, and with the intent of it not being a recap of her Wikipedia page or what had been said about her in the press. Bradley also felt the series should not be a definitive portrait of Osaka but a snapshot of a period of time in her life.  Principal photography on the series began from 2019 to early 2021.

In February 2020, it was announced Garrett Bradley would direct a docuseries revolving around Naomi Osaka with Netflix distributing, and Film45 and Uninterrupted producing.

Release
The series had its world premiere at AFI Docs on June 22, 2021. It was released on Netflix on July 16, 2021.

Reception
On Rotten Tomatoes, the series holds an approval rating of 93% based on 14 critics and an average rating of 8.42/10.  On Metacritic, it has a score of 76 out of 100 based on 12 critics, indicating "generally favorable reviews".

References

External links
 
 
 

2021 American television series debuts
2021 American television series endings
2020s American television miniseries
2020s American documentary television series
Television series based on actual events
Netflix original documentary television series
Naomi Osaka